Žiga Laci (born 20 July 2002) is a Slovenian professional footballer who plays as a centre-back for Greek Super League 2 club AEK Athens B.

Club career

Mura
In July 2018, Laci signed his first professional contract with Mura until 2021. He made his senior debut on 11 May 2019 in the 32nd round of the 2018–19 Slovenian PrvaLiga, coming on as a late substitute in a match against Krško, which Mura won 3–0.

AEK Athens
On 14 February 2020, Laci signed a three-year contract with Greek club AEK Athens. On 8 July 2021, his contract had been extended until the summer of 2026.

International career
Laci made his international debut on 21 February 2019, when he played for the Slovenian under-17 team in a 2–1 victory over Bosnia and Herzegovina. In March 2019, he played the elite round of the qualification for the 2019 UEFA European Under-17 Championship, where Slovenia was eliminated as the bottom of the group after two defeats and a draw.

On 26 July 2019, Laci debuted for the Slovenian under-19 side in a 3–1 win against the United Arab Emirates.

Career statistics

Club

References

External links

NZS profile 

2002 births
Living people
People from Murska Sobota
Slovenian footballers
Association football defenders
Slovenia youth international footballers
Slovenia under-21 international footballers
Slovenian expatriate footballers
NŠ Mura players
AEK Athens F.C. players
AEK Athens F.C. B players
FC Koper players
Slovenian expatriate sportspeople in Greece
Expatriate footballers in Greece
Slovenian PrvaLiga players
Super League Greece players
Super League Greece 2 players